Merradalen (also Mærradalen) was a station on the Kolsås Line of the Oslo Metro in Norway. It was opened as a station on the branch from Sørbyhaugen to Jar, in 1942. The station was located close to a bridge across the valley with the same name. Merradalen was closed on 5 July 1957 and replaced with Ullernåsen.

References

Disused Oslo Metro stations
1942 establishments in Norway
1957 disestablishments in Norway
Railway stations opened in 1942
Railway stations closed in 1957